Beliyar Ramdas Bhat was a professor and head of the department of statistics at Karnataka University for more than two decades. He was elected member of International Statistical Institute, and Fellow of Royal Statistical Society.

Bhat obtained a M.A. degree in mathematics from Madras University in 1954, and a M.A. degree in statistics from Karnataka University,  prior to working on a Ph.D. from Berkeley in 1961. His advisor was David Blackwell. Bhat was elected member of Institute of Mathematical Statistics, and South African Statistical Association. He was the Secretary, Editor and President of Indian Society for Probability and Statistics. He was also the past President of the Section of Statistics of the Indian Science Congress Association.

Selected works

References

External links
 

University of California, Berkeley alumni
Scientists from Karnataka
Year of birth unknown
Fellows of the Royal Statistical Society
Elected Members of the International Statistical Institute
Academic staff of Karnatak University